Cumberland 100A is an Indian reserve of the James Smith Cree Nation in Saskatchewan. It is 61 kilometres southeast of Prince Albert. The 2016 Canadian Census, recorded a population of 317 living in 79 of its 82 total private dwellings. In the same year, its Community Well-Being index was calculated at 50 of 100, compared to 58.4 for the average First Nations community and 77.5 for the average non-Indigenous community.

References

Indian reserves in Saskatchewan
Division No. 15, Saskatchewan